Rodels-Realta railway station is a station in Cazis, Switzerland. It is located on the  gauge Landquart–Thusis line of the Rhaetian Railway. It serves the villages of Rodels and Realta.

Services
The following services stop at Rodels-Realta:

 Chur S-Bahn : hourly service between Thusis and Chur.

References

External links
 
 

Railway stations in Graubünden
Rhaetian Railway stations
Railway stations in Switzerland opened in 1896